is a Japanese idol singer, and solo vocalist, affiliated with Johnny & Associates. In the 1980s he had a number of number 1 singles in Japan. He was awarded a Japan Music Award in 1983 for the song . He was part of the Tanokin Trio.

Biography 
Tahara is from Kofu, the capital city of Yamanashi Prefecture. He started acting in 1978, and officially debuted in June 1980, aged 19, with his first single 哀愁でいと(NEW YORK CITY NIGHTS), which made it to no. 2 in the Oricon Chart. In 1983 at the age of 22, he was featured in a 40" minute dance show and music documentary Love Forever directed by Umetsugu Inoue.

Tahara was invited to perform in the prestigious NHK year-end programme Kōhaku Uta Gassen from 1980 to 1986.

He made a comeback, 33 years after his debut, in June 2012 with the release of his 68th single, titled "Mr. Big". On June 19, 2013, he released his first original album in 15 years. In 2014, he celebrated the 35th anniversary of his debut.

Selected discography and filmography 
This is a list of Toshihiko Tahara's "master works" as listed on the Oricon website.
  (single, 1988)
  (television drama series, Fuji TV, 1988) — played the role of Ryūnosuke Tokugawa
  (single, 1989)

Film

Tanokin Super Hit Series
Graffiti Youth: Sneaker Blues (February 11, 1981)
Blue Jeans Memory (July 11, 1981)
Good Luck Love (December 20, 1981)
Highteen Boogie (August 7, 1982)
The Mysterious Gemini • Y&S (December 11, 1982)
Heart Beat (August 4, 1983)

Selected awards 
 1983: Japan Music Award — for the song

References

External links 
 
 Official blog

Japanese idols
Johnny & Associates

Pony Canyon artists
Musicians from Yamanashi Prefecture
Musicians from Kanagawa Prefecture
1961 births
Living people
20th-century Japanese male actors
20th-century Japanese male singers
20th-century Japanese singers
21st-century Japanese male singers
21st-century Japanese singers